Andrew Hodgson may refer to:

 Andrew Hodgson (translator) (born 1994), Japanese-to-English translator
 Andrew Hodgson (rugby) (born 1976), rugby league and rugby union footballer who played in the 1990s
 Andrew Hodgson (cricketer) (born 1941), former New Zealand born South African cricketer
 Andy Hodgson, auctioneer/presenter on the British television shopping channel bid tv